Lewis Hallam (circa 1714–1756) was an English-born actor and theatre director in the colonial United States.

Career
Hallam is thought to have been born in about 1714 and possibly in Dublin. His father Thomas Hallam was also an actor who was killed by actor Charles Macklin in 1736 at the Drury Lane Theatre, allegedly over a wig. Many of his siblings were actors and one was said to be an admiral. Hallam had a child Isabella who was baptised in London in 1746. He and his brother, William had only moderate success in Britain and they decided to try their skills in America.
Hallam arrived in North America in 1752 with his theatrical company, organized by his brother William, who was joint owner of the company with him. Lewis had been an actor in William's company in England, but it had failed, prompting the North American venture. The new company landed at Yorktown, Virginia.

The company began their performances in Williamsburg, then the capital of Virginia Colony. Here they hired a large wooden structure, which was roughly altered to suit their purposes. It was so near the forest that the players were able to shoot wild fowl from the windows of the building. Their opening performance was George Granville's The Jew of Venice, which Hallam billed as Shakespeare's The Merchant of Venice. Music was supplied by a single player on a harpsichord. From Williamsburg, the troupe traveled to Annapolis and Philadelphia.

In 1753, Hallam took over the first theater in Manhattan, the Theatre on Nassau Street. He and his theatre company also toured throughout the Thirteen Colonies.

Hallam died in Jamaica, where the company had gone to perform. His widow the actor Sarah Hallam Douglass (d. Philadelphia, 1773) married David Douglas, with whom she formed the American Company in 1758. Her son by Lewis, Lewis Hallam Jr., known as Lewis Hallam the Younger, became an actor in his mother and step-father's company.

References

External links
Lewis Hallam; North American Theatre Online(AlexanderStreet)

1710s births
1756 deaths
18th-century American male actors
18th-century English male actors
Male actors from New York (state)
American directors
American male stage actors
American theatre directors
English male stage actors
British emigrants to the Thirteen Colonies
People of the Province of New York
Virginia colonial people
18th-century theatre managers